Birthana aurantiaca is a moth in the family Immidae. It was described by Georg Semper in 1899. It is found in the Philippines.

References

Moths described in 1899
Immidae
Moths of Asia